The eighth season of the American competitive television series BattleBots premiered on Discovery on May 11, 2018. This is the first season of Battlebots to premiere on Discovery Channel and the third season since the show was rebooted in 2015. Encore episodes debuted on Science Channel on May 16, 2018.

In February 2018, Discovery Channel and Science Channel announced that it had picked up BattleBots after it was unofficially cancelled at ABC, marking the second time in the series' history that new episodes premiered on a new network. It features the "biggest, baddest, strongest and fastest next-generation robots from all over the world" as they battle it out in the battle arena for a chance to win the Robot Combat Sports championship.

Former UFC fighter Kenny Florian and MLB/NFL Sportscaster Chris Rose returned from the last two seasons to host this eighth season of BattleBots on Discovery. Also returning is Faruq Tauheed as the arena announcer. Former Battlebots judge Jessica Chobot replaced Alison Haislip as the sideline and behind the scenes reporter.

Judges

The current judges are the former Battlebots "bad boy" Derek Young, esports "maven" Naomi Kyle, and legendary roboticist Mark Setrakian. The guest judge (episode 3) was special effects "guru" Frank Ippolito. For episode 7, Grant Imahara from Mythbusters and NASA systems engineer Bobak Ferdowsi, who worked on the Mars Landing, were guest judges. Episode 9 featured former BattleBots sideline correspondent Alison Haislip as a guest judge. Lisa Winter 2015 captain of team Plan X and 2016 captain of team Mega Tento is a guest judge as well. Episode 15 featured YouTube star Simone Giertz as a guest judge.

Contestants

This season, 55 robots weighing a maximum of 250 pounds have the chance to fight up to four times each. Their goal is to earn a top 16 ranking and qualify for the post-season where there will be knockout rounds until a winner-take-all fight to crown the 2018 BattleBots World Champion. The contestants hailed from all over the world including: Brazil, Canada, Netherlands, New Zealand, United Kingdom and the United States. 

A 56th robot, Raven, was supposed to compete in BattleBots, but due to its unfinished state and time constraints, it never made it into the competition.

Tournament

This season featured a new fight format with the mid-season (episode 11) "Desperado Tournament" where eight bots whose season started poorly will have a one time opportunity to reverse their fortunes. Eight teams will get a second chance to battle it out tournament style in the battle box. The lone survivor who can win three fights in a row will earn an automatic spot into the Top 16 and will be the first entrance into the 2018 BattleBot Championship and also win the Desperado Tournament giant bolt trophy. Meanwhile, the losing bots will go back into the Battle Box to finish out the season.

Seeding
Lock-Jaw (1-2)
Gigabyte (0-1)
Lucky (0-2)
Valkyrie (1-1)
Hypothermia (0-2)
Gemini (1-0)
Double Dutch (2-0)
Kraken (0-2)

Desperado Tournament Bracket

KO: Knockout
UD: Unanimous Decision

This season will have a 16 bot tournament to decide who will get the giant nut. The winner of the Desperado Tournament, Lock-Jaw, has already clinched a spot in the tournament. Then a committee will choose the other 15 bots.

Desperado Quarterfinals

 The robot was the winner of the battle and moved on to the Semifinals.
 The robot was the loser of the battle and was eliminated.
 Only highlights from the battle(s) were shown.
KO: Knockout
SD: Split Decision

Desperado Semifinals

 The robot was the winner of the battle and moved on to the Final.
 The robot was the loser of the battle and was eliminated.
KO: Knockout

Desperado Final

 The robot was the winner of the battle and moved on to the Top 16 Tournament Bracket.
 The robot was the loser of the battle and was eliminated.
KO: Knockout

Seeding
Tombstone (4–0)
Bronco (4–0) 
Bite Force (4–0) 
Minotaur (3–1) 
SawBlaze (3–1) 
Icewave (3–1) 
Yeti (3–1) 
Son of Whyachi (3–1) 
Lock Jaw (4–2) 
Whiplash (3–1) 
ROTATOR (3–1) 
Monsoon (3–1) 
Witch Doctor (3–1) 
HUGE (3–1) 
WAR Hawk (4–1) 
Bombshell (0–4)

Top 16 Bracket

KO: Knockout
UD: Unanimous Decision
SD: Split Decision

Round of 16

 The robot was the winner of the battle and moved on to the Quarterfinals.
 The robot was the loser of the battle and was eliminated.
 Only highlights from the battle(s) were shown.
KO: Knockout
UD: Unanimous Decision

Quarterfinals

 The robot was the winner of the battle and moved on to the Semifinals.
 The robot was the loser of the battle and was eliminated.
KO: Knockout

Semifinals & Championship

 The robot was the winner of the battle.
 The robot was the loser of the battle.
 The robot was the winner of the battle and became the champion of BattleBots 2018.
KO: Knockout

Episodes

Giant Bolt Awards
Four giant bolt awards were made for the 2018 season. The winner of the Desperado Tournament (episode 11) received a bolt award. The other three "Best of Show" awards were presented in the Battlebox towards the end of filming and were announced by Battlebots on Facebook and Twitter on 16 October 2018.

References

2018 American television seasons
BattleBots